Rochy-Condé is a commune in the Oise department in northern France. Rochy-Condé station has rail connections to Beauvais and Creil.

See also
 Communes of the Oise department

References

Communes of Oise